Trigonopeplus binominis is a species of beetle in the family Cerambycidae. It was described by Chevrolat in 1861.

References

Anisocerini
Beetles described in 1861